The Green Death is the fifth and final serial of the tenth season of the British science fiction television series Doctor Who, which was first broadcast in six weekly parts on BBC1 from 19 May to 23 June 1973. It was the last regular appearance of Katy Manning as companion Jo Grant.

In the serial, the alien time traveller the Third Doctor (Jon Pertwee) and the organisation UNIT investigate a South Wales mine where waste from an oil plant has killed miners and made maggots grow to giant size.

Plot

The Third Doctor is making adjustments to the TARDIS' coordinate programmer in preparation for a visit to Metebelis Three, when Jo reads in a newspaper about the mysterious death of a miner named Hughes in the abandoned coal mine in Llanfairfach in South Wales. The miner was found dead and glowing bright green. Brigadier Lethbridge-Stewart and Jo go down to investigate the miner's death. The Doctor agrees to follow the Brigadier, but is determined to go to Metebelis Three first.

The Brigadier's first port of call is the recently opened Global Chemicals oil plant, close to the abandoned mine. Its headman, Stevens, claims that the plant can "produce 25% more petrol and diesel fuel from a given quantity of crude oil"—but that the 'Stevens process' only produces a minimal amount of waste. Local environmental scientist Professor Cliff Jones is convinced that the oil-making process must create thousands of gallons of waste. He also believes that there is a link between Global Chemicals and Hughes' death—but his research is too demanding for him to go down the mine and investigate. Jo heads for the mineshaft.

The Doctor reaches Metebelis Three, but it is far from the "blue paradise" he described. He is attacked by various unseen creatures, and returns to the UNIT laboratory with only a small blue crystal to show for his misadventure. He then drives down to South Wales in his car, Bessie, and meets the Brigadier at Global Chemicals. They then set off to go down the mine to investigate, despite Stevens' insistence that it should be sealed. Stevens summons his henchman, Hinks, and tells him in a strange emotionless voice "nobody must go down the mine". Hinks leaves and Stevens dons a pair of strange headphones.

Jo has arrived at the pithead ahead of the Doctor and the Brigadier, and gone down the shaft with a miner called Bert to help another man, Dai Evans, who has called for help at the bottom of the mine. When the Doctor and the Brigadier arrive, Dave, the man controlling the cage's descent, finds that the brake has been sabotaged. The Doctor slows the cage's descent, but his efforts leave Jo and Bert trapped at the bottom of the shaft. There, they find Dai, who is turning bright green and dying. Bert remembers there is an emergency shaft out of the mine, and he and Jo set off.

The Doctor suggests cutting the mineshaft cables and linking it up to a donkey engine, which would enable him to use the second cage to get down the mine. The Brigadier goes to Global Chemicals to request some cutting equipment, but a man named Fell informs him that they do not have such equipment. The Doctor has Professor Jones and his environmentalist friends create a demonstration at the Global Chemicals gate, while he slips in, in an attempt to steal the equipment. However, he is captured. Fortunately, Dave and the Brigadier, while on their way to get cutting equipment, stopped at a petrol station and found a man using the required equipment to cut up an old car. They borrow this, free the secondary mine cage, and the Doctor goes down the shaft with Dave and two other miners. They find Dai now dead and a note from Jo telling them that she and Bert have headed for the emergency shaft.

Jo and Bert have made good progress through the old mine tunnels, when they find a green slime trickling down the wall. When Bert touches this, he begins to grow weak, and his hand starts to turn bright green. At Bert's insistence, Jo goes on without him. Dave and the Doctor find Bert, and the Doctor goes on to find Jo. By the time they reunite, Jo has found a vast lake of bright green slime, filled with huge maggot creatures. When the tunnel collapses behind them, they use an old mining wagon to get across the green lake. They then climb a steep shaft, where the Doctor collects a huge egg to take back for experimentation. At the top of the natural shaft, they find a large pipe, with the insides covered with traces of crude oil waste—meaning that the pipe leads to the Global Chemicals plant.

In the plant, a worker named Elgin, an old friend of Fell, tells him about Dai's death and the dying Bert. Elgin later follows Fell into a pumping control room, where Fell is pumping the oil waste from the main tank on level four into another tank. The security system then registers the Doctor and Jo's presence in the pipe. Fell, who has actually arranged for the waste to be pumped down the pipe into the abandoned mine workings, is initially reluctant to rescue the two in the pipe. Elgin convinces Fell to help him open the hatch, and the Doctor and Jo escape as the oil waste cascades down the pipe. Fell goes to see Stevens, complaining about a 'headache', and Stevens puts the headphones on Fell. A voice tells Stevens that 'Fell's 'processing' was a failure' and orders self-destruction. After Stevens presses a button on a control panel, Fell leaves the room and jumps off a balcony to his death.

The Doctor, Jo and the Brigadier end the day with a meal of fungus at Jones' retreat, the "Nuthutch", but the frivolity is cut short when they hear Bert too has died. After everyone retires to bed the egg the Doctor brought back from the mine hatches out into a giant maggot. Escaping from the lab where the egg was left, the maggot first heads for Jo, but then jumps on and bites Hinks, sent to the Nuthutch by Stevens to steal the egg. The maggot escapes from the house into the dark, and Hinks quickly weakens as the poisonous "green death" infection spreads through his body. The next morning, the Brigadier has the UNIT troops lay explosives and detonate the whole mine pithead, to the Doctor's fury. This fails to trap the maggots in the mine, as they begin to emerge; first, attempting to escape up the Global Chemicals waste disposal pipe, then burrowing through the slagheap near the mine.

At Global Chemicals, Mike Yates has been sent in undercover by the Brigadier, and is contacted by the Doctor, who dons some improbable disguises in order to get through the gates and move freely. Having liaised with Yates, the Doctor learns that Stevens takes his instructions from someone on the top floor of the complex, and heads up there in the special lift to find out who is in charge. He discovers that this is the home of the BOSS, a supercomputer with its own megalomaniacal personality. It runs the company, controls Stevens and other key staff members, and is responsible for the polluting chemical process. The Doctor rejects the brainwashing technique that Stevens and the BOSS subject him to – but Yates is more susceptible and is converted into one of the computer's slaves. After the Doctor escapes, Yates is sent to the Nuthutch to kill the Doctor. His conditioning is deep, and is only broken by the Doctor's use of the blue crystal he brought from Metebelis Three.

Jo has alienated Jones, with whom she is falling in love, by ruining one of his experimenting slides of green slime. Determined to make amends, she heads to the slagheap in search of a maggot to run some tests on. Meanwhile, Jones finds that the fungus powder Jo spilt on the slides is actually a cure for the "green death" infection. He races to the slag heap to find Jo surrounded by giant maggots, and they are both caught in an RAF bombing raid on the maggots. Jones is infected with the 'green death' and begins to turn green — and all before he was able to share his knowledge of the cure. Jo contacts her UNIT friends with her radio, and the Doctor and Sergeant Benton rescue the two from the maggots in Bessie. Hearing Jones utter the word "serendipity", the Doctor realises that Jones might have stumbled upon something that could combat the maggots and their infection. Benton arrives with a maggot chrysalis—proof that the maggots are beginning to transform into mature giant insects. Then, the maggot that escaped from the laboratory is found on the table—dead. Realising that the creature died from eating some of the fungus, the Doctor also discovers the cure for Jones. The Doctor and Benton drive around the slag heaps, scattering the fungus, which proves deadly to the maggots. They are then attacked by a giant fly creature—the mature adult form of the maggots—which the Doctor kills by throwing his cloak over it when it is in mid-air, causing it to get tangled in it and fall to the ground.

The Doctor returns to Global Chemicals to confront the BOSS. The computer plans to link up with others and effect a corporate takeover of the human race. By now, Stevens is completely under the computer's control. The Doctor tells Stevens that the BOSS' "efficiency" will result in greater pollution, brainless brainwashed humans, and more death and disease. The Doctor then uses his blue crystal to break Stevens' hypnotic state, and Stevens, infuriated at what the BOSS has done to him, cross-feeds the generator circuits, causing the whole plant to explode, killing Stevens and destroying the insane computer.

The menace defeated, UNIT troops and environmentalists gather at the Nuthutch for a celebration made all the more special when Jo and Jones announce they are getting married. The Doctor gives his blessing and gives Jo the blue crystal as a wedding present, but since this means the end of Jo's travels with the Doctor, he is evidently upset by the situation and quietly slips away while the party is in full swing.

As Jo and Jones dance, the Doctor drives Bessie off into the sunset.

Production
In the footage of the maggots around the quarry site, several of the maggot props were in fact inflated condoms (some inflated with air, others with water). The colliery used for filming was Ogilvie Colliery near Deri, Caerphilly, while Global Chemicals was the RCA International factory in Brynmawr. The script required the Doctor to state that the maggots have "thick chitinous skin". Pertwee asked producer Barry Letts how to pronounce the word, and Letts, unaware of the term, told him to pronounce the first syllable "chit", rather than the more correct "kite". Two days after Episode 4 was broadcast, Letts received a letter consisting simply of the words, "The reason I'm writin'/Is how to say kitin ."

The prime minister is addressed as "Jeremy", which was a production joke referring to the then Liberal Party leader Jeremy Thorpe.

In 2004, Barry Letts said he was unhappy with the colour separation overlay effect used for the cavern scenes in this story.

Cast notes
Tony Adams, who played Elgin, was taken ill during the recording of The Green Death, and so Roy Skelton was brought in to play a new character called Mr James, who was given the lines written for Elgin. In Global Conspiracy (see 'Home media'), Adams actually uses his real illness as an explanation for his character's sudden absence towards the end of the story.

The part of Professor Clifford Jones was played by Stewart Bevan. Bevan was at the time engaged to Katy Manning. The fictional couple become engaged at the end of the story, whereas Bevan and Manning separated a year after the show was recorded.

Talfryn Thomas, who plays Dave had previously appeared in Spearhead from Space as Mullins.  

John Dearth, who voiced BOSS, would later play Lupton in Planet of the Spiders (1974).

Broadcast and reception

An edited, condensed single omnibus episode of the story was broadcast on BBC1 at 4:00 pm on 27 December 1973, reaching a higher audience than the original episodes, with 10.4 million viewers. A repeat series of all six episodes was shown on BBC2 from 2 January to 6 February 1994, with ratings of 1.3, 1.1, 0.8, 1.1, 1.3 and 1.3 million viewers respectively. BBC Four showed the story in three double-length episodes at 7:10 pm on 3–5 April 2006.

Paul Cornell, Martin Day, and Keith Topping gave the serial a favourable review in The Discontinuity Guide (1995), though they noted that it "patronises the Welsh". In The Television Companion (1998), David J. Howe and Stephen James Walker felt that the story was "nicely set up", although they said that the script resorted to stereotypes with the hippies and the Welshmen. While noting that the story "suffers from an over-reliance on CSO" and that the acting of the Global Chemicals employees failed to impress, they praised the maggots, and Jo's departure. In 2010, Mark Braxton of Radio Times awarded it five stars out of five. He described The Green Death as "entertaining, frightening, poignant and important". He also felt the CSO was "woeful" but the maggots a success, and additionally praised the moral and cultural messages. 

In 2012, SFX named Jo's departure as the fourth-greatest companion farewell, noting how it was the first time the Doctor was "truly upset" since leaving Susan. In 2009, they listed the scene where a giant maggot approaches Jo as the eighth-scariest Doctor Who moment. The magazine also listed the scene where the Doctor dresses in drag as one of the silliest moments in Doctor Who history in a 2010 article. In 2013, Ben Lawrence of The Daily Telegraph named The Green Death as one of the top ten Doctor Who stories set in the contemporary time. In the book Doctor Who: The Episode Guide, Mark Campbell awarded it ten out of ten, describing it as "one of the very best UNIT stories, offering terrifying maggots, horrible green slime and some very scary cliffhangers. There is also real character development and an attempt to address adult themes in an adult way." He also thought Jo's departure was "one of the series' saddest moments."

Commercial releases

In print

A novelisation of this serial, written by Malcolm Hulke, was published by Target Books in August 1975. The company Global Chemicals had to be changed to Panorama Chemicals because a real Global Chemicals was found to exist. Hulke tells the story from several points of view including the possessed Stevens, the psychotic Hinks and even a hungry maggot. An unabridged reading by Katy Manning of the novelisation was released on CD in September 2008 by BBC Audiobooks.

Home media
The story was released on VHS in October 1996 as a two-tape set. On the back of the VHS box, BBC Video presented this serial's release as a tribute to Jon Pertwee, who had died a few months earlier in May 1996. 

The Green Death was released on DVD in the United Kingdom on 10 May 2004. The Green Death featured in issue 48 of Doctor Who DVD Files, published 3 November 2010. A Special Edition DVD of the serial was released in the UK on 5 August 2013 containing extra bonus features including a new 25-minute documentary on the making of the serial called "The One With the Maggots", as well as The Sarah Jane Adventures serial Death of the Doctor, which reunites the Doctor and Jo.

The DVD release of this story features a fictitious documentary, Global Conspiracy, starring Mark Gatiss as investigative reporter Terry Scanlon, following up the events surrounding the incident at Global Chemicals. Several actors from The Green Death briefly reprise their roles, and it is revealed that Stevens and BOSS survived.

The serial was released on Blu-ray as part of "The Collection - Season 10" boxed set in July 2019 featuring special features from both DVD releases as well as new content created specially for this release.

See also
 Arachnids in the UK

Notes

References

External links

Target novelisation

Third Doctor serials
Doctor Who serials novelised by Malcolm Hulke
1973 British television episodes
Television episodes set in Wales